Sergi Pàmies (born 28 January 1960) is a Spanish writer, translator, journalist and television and radio presenter. He is the son of the writer Teresa Pàmies and the former general secretary of the Unified Socialist Party of Catalonia, Gregorio López Raimundo. In his works he employs humor and parody mixing them with themes of failure and desperation. He translated works by Guillaume Apollinaire, Jean-Philippe Toussaint, Agota Kristof, Daniel Pennac and Amélie Nothomb. He received several awards for his literary works.

Works

Story collections
 T'hauria de caure la cara de vergonya, 1986 (published in English as Losing Face, 1993)
 Infecció, 1987 ('Infection')
 La gran novel·la sobre Barcelona ('The Great Novel About Barcelona'; Crítica Serra d'Or award)
 L'últim llibre de Sergi Pàmies, 2000 ('The Last Book by Sergi Pàmies')
 Si menges una llimona sense fer ganyotes, 2006 ('If You Eat a Lemon Without Making Grimaces'; City of Barcelona award, Lletra d'Or award)
 La bicicleta estàtica, 2010 ('The Stationary Bicycle')
 Cançons d'amor i de pluja, 2013 ('Songs of Love and Rain')
 L'Art De Portar Gavardina, (to be published by Other Press in English as 'The Art of Wearing a Trench Coat', March 2021)

Novels
 La primera pedra, 1990 (The First Stone; Ícaro award)
 L'instint, 1993 (The Instinct; Prudenci Bertrana Prize)
 Sentimental, 1995 (Sentimental)

References

External links
 Sergi Pàmies at the AELC (The Association of Catalan Language Writers), webpage in Catalan, English and Spanish.
 
 Biography, critical articles and interviews at "Ciutat de Barcelona - Corpus Literari" 

1960 births
Living people
French emigrants to Spain
Spanish male short story writers
Spanish short story writers
Catalan-language writers
Journalists from Catalonia
Radio personalities from Catalonia
Spanish television personalities
Translators from Catalonia
French–Catalan translators